Breakfast is the longest running morning program on Studio 23, a television channel in the Philippines. Directed by Arnel Jacobe. It is hosted by Atom Araullo, Patty Laurel, Asia Agcaoili and JC Cuadrado. It is also the morning show for the Filipino youth. It airs from 6:00 am to 7:30 am, Mondays to Fridays. The program, together with Magandang Umaga, Pilipinas, aired their last episode on June 22, 2007.

It was originally created by David Celdran, Techie Severino and Jess Liwanag for ANC in 1999. Directed by Carrie Jose, the original members were Lia Andanar Yu, Billy Aniceto, Angel Rivero, Mitzi Borromeo, Mico Halili, Karmina Constantino and JC Gonzalez.

Daily segments
Quick News
News for the youth, delivered fresh and fast (topics divided into: top news for the day, showbiz, sports, and human interest)
Served Hot
Live interview of the most controversial personalities on the hottest topic of the day
ATOMic Kitchen
Atom Araullo prepares, Easy to prepare meals done in a minute or two
Fab Fix
A dose of beauty tips, fashion advice, and guide for healthy living
B(reakfast) List
A must see for the Pinoy youth who wants to experience it all despite the tight budget, a feature on the best finds and buys all over the metro.
On the Road
Traffic updates and road tips for safe and speedy driving
Daily Dose
Time for the hosts to speak up and share their personal thoughts and experiences o
Get a Job
Job openings for the job-seeking Filipino youth
Daily Specials
Interview of the live guest band/performer for the day
School Buzz
School events and activities  in Tokyo
Early Bird Question
A host asks a question. And a caller or texter will win prizes

Weekly segments
Moneymaking Monday
About business
Whose Day Tuesday
Showing well-renowned personalities in sports, and arts
Wednesdays Worth Watching
Reviews movies that are now showing. Plus behind the scenes of movies.
Techie Thursday
Showing the latest gadgets, websites and more. Giving tips how to create a blog or website
Fab Friday
Shows fashions and style
Shifting gears
Your law

Hosts

Final hosts
 Patty Laurel
 JC Cuadrado
 Atom Araullo
 Asia Agcaoili

Former
 Ryan Agoncillo
 Bianca Gonzalez
 Bam Aquino
 JC Gonzalez
 Nikki Gil
 Mariel Rodriguez
 Joaqui Valdez
 Pia Arcangel
 Ria Tanjuatco-Trillo
 Patricia Evangelista
 Angel Rivero
 Marieton Pacheco
 Juddha Paolo
 Lia Andanar Yu
 Billy Aniceto
 Mitzi Borromeo
 Karmina Constantino
 Mico Halili

After Breakfast morning show
After the cancellation of the morning program, the hosts are in various television and radio programs: 

Patty Laurel still teaches in pre-school.

JC Cuadrado is now inactive in showbiz.

Atom Araullo is formerly a news reporter on ABS-CBN 2 and also hosted a morning program, Umagang Kay Ganda, and also he hosted Hiwaga and now he is seen on public service program of the network Red Alert, which is part of Pinoy True Stories. In 2017, he went back to GMA Network.

Asia Agcaoili quit show business and her last TV appearance was iPBA aired on ABC 5 in 2007, and Asia is now married.

Ryan Agoncillo is now host on the longest running variety noontime show Eat Bulaga! and game show Picture! Picture! and his sitcom Ismol Family on GMA 7, and also hosted a talent program Talentadong Pinoy on TV5, and also a movie actor on the films Kasal, Kasali, Kasalo, Sakal, Sakali, Saklolo and My House Husband: Ikaw Na! with his real life wife Judy Ann Santos-Agoncillo, he is also a hobbyist on Car Drifting & photography.

Bianca Gonzales hosted programs on ABS-CBN 2 & Cinema One, she is now seen on the Filipino morning program Umagang Kay Ganda and also she hosted a reality competition show Pinoy Big Brother.

JC Gonzales is now based in California for hosting a youth-oriented talk show on The Filipino Channel.

Bam Aquino became a senator of the Philippines between 2013 and 2019.

Nikki Gil is now a TV host and actress on ABS-CBN but she also hosted ASAP and she is still a VJ on myx, her former teleseryes are Pieta, Mundo Man ay Magunaw, Maria Mercedes and her newest Hawak Kamay aired on the network itself.

Mariel Rodriguez is now an actress and TV host, she hosted Wowowillie on TV5 and various movies like Agent X44 and Sa Ngalan ng Ama, Ina, at mga Anak.

Joaqui Valdez used to host a travel lifestyle program 100% Pinoy on GMA 7 and now currently inactive in showbiz.

Pia Arcangel is now a news anchor on GMA 7's longest running news program Saksi and the second-longest-running news program 24 Oras Weekend. She is also the former news anchor of Balitanghali on Q (now GMA News TV).

Ria Tanjuatco-Trillo hosts a shopping magazine talk show Shop Talk on ANC.

Marieton Pacheco is a news reporter on TFC in California.

Angel Rivero is still active on radio and television programs.

Juddah Paolo sings in various bars in Metro Manila.

See also
List of programs shown on the ABS-CBN News Channel
List of programs aired by Studio 23

Sources

External links
Studio 23

Studio 23 original programming
Philippine television news shows
ABS-CBN News and Current Affairs shows
Breakfast television in the Philippines
1999 Philippine television series debuts
2007 Philippine television series endings
English-language television shows
ABS-CBN News Channel original programming